Chevron Cars Ltd. is an English manufacturer of racing cars, founded by Derek Bennett in 1965.  Following Bennett's death in 1978, the firm has remained active in various guises.  The original company's designs and name continue to be used to build replacement parts and continuation models of earlier Chevrons.  In 2000, Chevron Racing Cars Ltd., founded by Vin Malkie acquired the trade mark Chevron Racing Cars Ltd and in addition to the company's other activities has designed and built new grand tourer racing cars under the Chevron name, as well as other continuation models of earlier Chevrons.

History

Derek Bennett
Derek Bennett was born in 1933 in Manchester; he was brought up in Prestwich. He was a largely self-taught, intuitive engineer and a talented amateur racing driver.

In his early years Bennett took a keen interest in model aircraft. He took an apprenticeship in mechanical and electrical engineering before becoming a mechanic, but he soon fell in with motor racing scene in the North of England, initially in local stock-car racing events.

Bennett soon graduated to building, maintaining and also driving racing cars for himself and other local enthusiasts, and established himself as a competitive driver at club level, particularly in the Bennett Special, running in a series for 1172cc Ford powered cars; he later moved into the Clubmans category. Bennett also built a one-off Formula Junior car which was only a modest success - rear-engined competition from Lotus and Cooper was more than a match for it, and the era of the special-builder in FJ was over.

By 1965 there were sufficient requests for replicas of his Clubmans car, Bennett seemed able to establish himself as a constructor and started his business and the Chevron marque in School Street, Salford. Aided by a small staff of like-minded enthusiasts (particularly friend and assistant Paul Owens), for a decade and a half Chevron produced successful, beautiful racing cars.

Bennett never proceeded beyond Formula Three in his own driving but remained quick enough to test and develop many of his cars, especially at the nearby Oulton Park and Aintree.

He was working on a Formula One Chevron when he was killed in a hang-gliding accident in 1978.

Chevron cars
Chevron was particularly noted for its small-capacity sports cars and its Formula Two, Formula Three and Formula 5000 single-seaters. Although a Chevron F5000 did beat a representative Formula One field once in a race open to both categories (Peter Gethin at the Race of Champions in 1973), the marque never seriously addressed F1; one F1 car was built but not finished in Bennett's lifetime and when complete was run only in the national-level Aurora F1 championship in Britain. Bennett was notable in his design genius for the first car with a diffuser - Chevron GT, first car with a crash box (called a "nose frame" in its day) Chevron B16.

Although the first Chevrons were developments of Derek Bennett's Clubmans special (Clubmans is a British national formula for front-engined open-top sports cars with Ford engines) the firm's customers soon started looking to more ambitious racing, and a line of gran turismo cars was soon established with the B3 (early type numbers were applied retroactively when the cars were homologated for Group 4 and 5 racing) which developed into a line of successful BMW and Ford-powered cars capable of competing internationally in the two-litre sports car class. The replacement for these cars was the B16, but driver Brian Redman pointed out that with heavy coupé bodywork it would be beaten on most circuits by lighter open-topped spyders from marques like Abarth. The B16 spyder was introduced, with a body inspired by the Porsche 908 spyder (which Redman also drove) and this started a long line of successful two-litre sports racers including the B19, B21, B23, B26, and B31.

Chevron was active and very successful in single-seater formulae during this period, concentrating mostly upon Formula 3 Formula Two and Formula Atlantic (aka SCCA Formula B) with minor variants of the same basic design. Nearly every Formula 1 driver of the 1970s drove a Chevron in their early careers including Niki Lauda.

Chevron was notable for its proud Lancastrian nature - unlike the rest of the British racing car industry which tended to be based in an arc running from South West London, the old Brooklands circuit and Heathrow Airport round to Silverstone, Chevron remained based in a mill in Bolton, and many of its most celebrated drivers, including Brian Redman and Jim Crawford were also Lancastrians. Many of Chevron's notable customers were also from the north of England including John Bridges, Digby Martland, and John Lepp.

The heyday of the marque ran through to the late 1970s and ended with Derek Bennett's death after a hang-gliding accident in 1978; Chevron continued in its original form owned by Derek's sisters for a couple of years with Tony Southgate as consultant designer then passed into other hands - some new cars were manufactured. Several key Chevron employees, including designer Paul Brown and co-founder and director Owens, also worked on the short-lived Maurer Formula Two cars, and later as a director at Reynard.

Some of the assets of the liquidated Derek Bennett Engineering Ltd were bought by a consortium of Scottish racing drivers and enthusiasts who formed Chevron Racing Cars (Scotland) Ltd as did other parties including Vin Malkie and Helen Bashford. This company produced spare parts for the range of Chevron cars as well as designing and building a few new Sports 2000 and Formula Atlantic models up until 1983 when this company also liquidated. Roger Andreason, whose Andreason Racing and Tuning business was, at that time running several Chevron cars for customers, purchased the assets of the liquidated Scottish consortium  Under control of Roger Andreason Chevron Cars Ltd. produced over 50 cars for Formula Ford, Formula Ford 2000, Sports 2000 and Group C categories - as well as maintaining the spare part service for existing Chevron owners.

In 2000 Vin Malkie, one of the original Chevron employees and owner of the first Chevron B1, produced, along with his wife and successful racing driver Helen Bashford-Malkie, acquired the Chevron trade mark and Chevron name. They continued their existing business as Chevron restorers and race preparers. They have since produced technically correct continuation models using largely original jigs and drawings, Vin and Helen still consulted with many of the original Chevron employees on a regular basis, not least Paul Owens, as part of their restoration process.
in 2011 in partnership with an investor they produced the Chevron GR8 and later the GR8 GT, campaigning successfully with BARC and the later GT car in British GT winning Goodwood Festival of Speed with race car driver Anthony Reid.

In 2006 Chris Smith purchased a majority share holding in the newly started company called Chevron Cars Ltd., from the owners Roger Andreason and Tim Colman. Both remained minority shareholders, with Colman remaining as a director. The following five years saw Smith invest substantially in Chevron. During this time he oversaw the construction of around 10 "continuation" B8 and B16 models, which were assembled by Kelvin Jones of Kelvin Jones Motorsport based in Liverpool.  In July 2011, Andreason and Colman bought back Smith's shareholding and Andreason was re-appointed as the managing director of Chevron Cars Limited, selling this company name in 2010.

In November 2016 the custodians of the marque for 35 years Vin Malkie and Helen Bashford-Malkie sold the Chevron group of companies including the IP, trademark, Chevron name including copyright to the trademark to WDK Holdings, Directors Nicola Foulston and Ian Cox who continue to manufacture Chevron components, cars, restorations and race preparation from their UK base in Stockbridge, Hampshire. Helen and Vin are to remain as consultants.

Modern Chevrons
Chevrons are popular cars in historic racing and various businesses still refettle and supply spares for the cars.  Continuation models of the 1970s Chevron B16 are built by both Chevron Cars and Chevron Racing, and are eligible for historic racing with FIA approval. As Oulton Park had been Bennett's home circuit, the Gold Cup meeting features races dedicated solely to Chevron's sportcars.

Chevron Racing has developed a GR8 model which competes in the British GT Championship as well as in a one-make series.

Cars
The following models were built by Chevron.

Superstition
The reader will note that there are no B11, B22, B33, B44. Derek Bennett was involved in an accident at Oulton Park to which the number 11 was variously connected, and as a result of this acquired a superstition about using the number, and its multiples. This superstition extended to the numbering of individual chassis, with no original Chevron chassis numbered in a multiple of 11.

See also
Reynard Motorsport
Lola Cars

References

External links

 Chevron Racing Ltd. website
 Chevron Cars Ltd. website

British racecar constructors
British auto racing teams
Auto racing teams established in 1965
1965 establishments in England
Formula Two constructors
Formula Two entrants
British GT Championship teams
British Formula Three teams
24 Hours of Le Mans teams